Ted Larsen (19 July 1923 - 28 October 1988) was  a former Australian rules footballer who played with North Melbourne in the Victorian Football League (VFL).

Notes

External links 		
		
		
		

		
		
		
1923 births		
1988 deaths		
Australian rules footballers from Victoria (Australia)		
North Melbourne Football Club players